César Garibaldi (born 1907) was an Argentine weightlifter. He competed in the men's lightweight event at the 1928 Summer Olympics.

References

1907 births
Year of death missing
Argentine male weightlifters
Olympic weightlifters of Argentina
Weightlifters at the 1928 Summer Olympics
Place of birth missing
20th-century Argentine people